Pizza of Death is a Japanese record label based in Tokyo, Japan, and was founded by Hi-Standard front man Ken Yokoyama. It was created in 1994 as a record label inside a record label (Fat Wreck Chords), and officially established itself as fully independent in 1999 with the release of Hi-Standard's Making the Road. The label currently holds 19 bands, 5 of which are based in The United States and Europe. One of these is Me First and the Gimme Gimmes, which is associated with several well-known American punk musicians from the United States, including producer and bassist Fat Mike of NOFX.

Toy's Factory currently distributes this label.

Current bands
Japanese bands:
Water Closet
Comeback my Daughters
Moga the 5
Toast
BBQ CHICKENS
Hawaiian6
Razors Edge
The Genbaku Onanies
Ken Yokoyama
Asparagus
Slimeball
Upper
F.I.B.
Garlic boys
WANIMA
Suspended 4th

North American and European bands:
Me First and the Gimme Gimmes
Good Riddance
Venerea
Satanic Surfers
Snuff

Compilations

The Best New-Comer Of The Year
The Very Best of Pizza of Death I
The Very Best of Pizza of Death II
Have a Slice of Death

References

External links
 https://www.webcitation.org/69unxG8vC?url=http://www.pizzaofdeath.com/index_e.html
 

Mass media companies based in Tokyo
Japanese record labels
Record labels established in 1994